Giulio Cesare Ferrari (1818-1899) was an Italian painter of the Neoclassical style.

He studied at the Academy of Fine Arts of Bologna under Clemente Albèri and Napoleone Angiolini. He began exhibiting in 1836, influenced by Rodolfo Fantuzzi. In 1844, along with Alessandro Guardassoni, he moved to Modena working with Adeodato Malatesta, painting historic and genre subjects.

Among his pupils was Gaetano Chierici.

References

1818 births
1899 deaths
19th-century Italian painters
19th-century Italian male artists
Italian male painters
Painters from Bologna
Italian neoclassical painters
Accademia di Belle Arti di Bologna alumni